Irene Marcuse was an American author of mystery novels. She was a finalist for the Agatha Award in 2000. She died March 8, 2021.
 
Marcuse held a BA in Literature and Creative Writing and a Master of Social Work from Columbia University. She was the granddaughter of social philosopher Herbert Marcuse and daughter of his only child Peter Marcuse.

Books
Marcuse's Anita Servi series includes:
 The Death of an Amiable Child (2000)
 Guilty Mind (2001)
 Consider the Alternative (2002)
 Under the Manhattan Bridge (2004)

Her book Under the Manhattan Bridge is set in  October 2001, in a city still coping with the impact of 9/11.  According to a review in The New York Times of post-9/11 mystery novels, it features "garbage trucks used as barricades and surreally polite New Yorkers."

Notes

External links
 Official web page
Obituary

20th-century American novelists
21st-century American novelists
American mystery writers
American women novelists
American people of German-Jewish descent
Jewish American novelists
Living people
Women mystery writers
20th-century American women writers
21st-century American women writers
Columbia University School of Social Work alumni
Year of birth missing (living people)
21st-century American Jews